Joan B. Silk (born December 16, 1953) is an American primatologist,  Regents Professor in the School of Human Evolution and Social Change (SHESC) at Arizona State University  . Her research interests include evolutionary anthropology, animal behavior, and primatology. Together with her anthropologist husband, Robert T. Boyd (also a professor in the same school), she wrote the textbook How Humans Evolved.

Life 
Silk was born in Riverside, California. She studied anthropology at the Pitzer College, Claremont Colleges, earning a bachelor's degree in 1975. She earned a master's degree in anthropology at the University of California, Davis in 1978 and completed her Ph.D. in anthropology from Davis in 1981. After postdoctoral research in the Department of Biology at the University of Chicago, she became an assistant professor at Emory University from 1984–1986. From 1986 to 2012, Silk was on the faculty of the University of California, Los Angeles Department of Anthropology and served as Department Chair for six years. She is currently a Regents Professor at the School of Human Evolution and Social Change at Arizona State University.

Honors and awards 
Silk is a Fellow of the American Academy of Arts and Sciences, a Fellow of the Animal Behavior Society, and a Fellow of the American Anthropological Association.

Books 
Silk is the coauthor or coeditor of:
 Boyd, Robert; Silk, Joan B. (2017). How Humans Evolved, Eighth Edition. W.W. Norton. .
 Mitani, John C.; Call, Josep; Palombit, Ryne A.; Silk, Joan B., Eds. (2012). The Evolution of Primate Societies. .
 Kappeler, Peter M.; Silk, Joan B., Eds. (2010). Mind the Gap: Tracing the Origins of Human Universals. .

References

External links

1953 births
Living people
American mammalogists
Women primatologists
Primatologists
Pitzer College alumni
University of California, Davis alumni
Emory University faculty
University of California, Los Angeles faculty
Arizona State University faculty
20th-century American zoologists
21st-century American zoologists